To Ngoc Van is a pit-floored crater on Mercury, named after the Vietnamese artist Tô Ngọc Vân. It was discovered in January 2008 during the first flyby of the planet by MESSENGER spacecraft. Its floor displays an irregularly shaped collapse feature, which is called a central pit. Such a feature may have resulted from collapse of a magma chamber underlying the central part of the crater. The collapse feature is an analog of Earth's volcanic calderas.

To the southeast of To Ngoc Van is Bruegel crater, and to the northwest is Burns.

References

Impact craters on Mercury